George Armstrong Halsey (December 7, 1827 – April 1, 1894) was an American Republican Party politician and leather manufacturer from New Jersey, who served two non-consecutive terms representing .

Early life and education
Born in Springfield Township, New Jersey, Halsey attended local schools as a child and later Springfield Academy. He engaged in manufacturing leather in Newark, New Jersey in 1844 and later in the wholesale clothing business. He was a member of the New Jersey General Assembly in 1861 and 1862, was United States assessor of internal revenue from 1862 to 1866 and resumed the leather business in 1866.

Congress
Halsey was elected a Republican to the United States House of Representatives in 1866, serving from 1867 to 1869, being unsuccessful for reelection in 1868. He was later elected back in 1870, serving again from 1871 to 1873, not being a candidate for renomination in 1872. There, he served as chairman of the Committee on Public Buildings and Grounds from 1871 to 1873.

Post Congress and death
Afterwards, he resumed former manufacturing pursuits and was president of and insurance company.

Halsey died in Newark, New Jersey on April 1, 1894 and was interred in Mount Pleasant Cemetery in Newark.

External links

George Armstrong Halsey at The Political Graveyard

1827 births
1894 deaths
Burials at Mount Pleasant Cemetery (Newark, New Jersey)
Republican Party members of the New Jersey General Assembly
Politicians from Newark, New Jersey
People from Springfield Township, Union County, New Jersey
Politicians from Union County, New Jersey
Republican Party members of the United States House of Representatives from New Jersey
19th-century American politicians